KTMK (91.1 FM) is a non-commercial educational radio station licensed to serve Tillamook, Oregon, United States. The station is owned by Oregon Public Broadcasting.

KTMK broadcasts a public radio news/talk format. The station airs programs from National Public Radio, Public Radio International, American Public Media, and other public radio syndicates.

History
The Tillicum Foundation received the original construction permit for this station from the Federal Communications Commission on July 29, 2002. The new station was assigned the KTMK call sign by the FCC on March 20, 2003.

In August 2002, the Tillicum Foundation reached an agreement to sell this station to Oregon Public Broadcasting. The deal was approved by the FCC on October 1, 2002, and the transaction was consummated on January 16, 2003. KTMK received its license to cover from the FCC on February 14, 2006.

References

External links
KTMK official website

TMK
News and talk radio stations in the United States
Tillamook County, Oregon
NPR member stations
Public Radio International stations
2006 establishments in Oregon